No. 577 Squadron was an anti-aircraft co-operation unit of the Royal Air Force formed during World War II and active from December 1943 till June 1946 in the defence of the Midlands.

History
577 squadron was formed on 1 December 1943 at RAF Castle Bromwich from elements of nos.6, 7 and 8 anti-aircraft cooperation units (AACU). It operated a varied lot of aircraft on airfields and bases all over the Midlands and Wales. On 15 June 1946 the squadron disbanded at Castle Bromwich.

Aircraft operated

Squadron bases

References

Notes

Bibliography

Aircraft squadrons of the Royal Air Force in World War II
577 Squadron
Military units and formations established in 1943